At 2:10 p.m. local time (UTC-5) on 28 January 2020, an earthquake of 7.7  struck on the north side of the Cayman Trough, north of Jamaica and west of the southern tip of Cuba, with the epicenter being 80 miles (130 km) ESE of Cayman Brac, Cayman Islands or 83 miles (134 km) north of Montego Bay, Jamaica. Schools in Jamaica and buildings in Miami were evacuated after shaking was observed in parts of the U.S. state of Florida. Light shaking was also reported on the Yucatan peninsula in Mexico. It is the largest earthquake in the Caribbean since 1946. A tsunami warning for the Caribbean Sea was issued by the Pacific Tsunami Warning Center and later withdrawn.

Tectonic setting 
The eastern part of the Cayman Trough forms part of the Gonâve Microplate, which lies between the North American Plate and the Caribbean Plate. It is bounded to both north and south by large transform faults that together accommodate the relative displacement of the two major plates. To the north the boundary is the western part of the Septentrional-Oriente fault zone, which accommodates 6–11 mm per year of plate boundary motion, while to the south the boundary is formed by the Walton fault zone to the west of Jamaica and the Enriquillo–Plantain Garden fault zone to the east, accommodating about 8 mm per year.

Earthquake

The focal mechanism, combined with an analysis of seismic waveforms, is consistent with strike-slip motion on the Septentrional-Oriente fault zone. The mainshock was followed by a series of aftershocks, with the largest being a 6.1  event that occurred less than three hours later, to the southeast of Grand Cayman. The modelled rupture zone extends from just west of the epicenter of the M 6.1 aftershock to just east of the mainshock epicenter, suggesting unilateral westward propagation. Two episodes of supershear rupture have been identified from the inversion of teleseismic P waveforms.

Impact

Cayman Islands
There were cracked roads and many sinkholes. All government schools were closed to allow inspections for possible damage, but they were all reopened on January 30 as no major damage had been found that related to the earthquake.

Jamaica
A six-story building on the Mona campus of the University of the West Indies, containing approximately 300 students, was evacuated. Damage was reported from at least two parishes in western Jamaica.

Cuba
Tremors were felt on the southern coast of the island. A spokesman for Guantanamo Bay Naval Base stated that there were no reports of damages or injuries. Granma Province was affected by the strongest shaking, being closest to the epicenter. A survey carried out by the National Center for Seismological Research, found that one house had completely collapsed and another 300 showed some damage. The houses affected were all ones that were not in good condition before the earthquake. Damage was also reported from some schools and daycare centers.

United States
Tremors were felt throughout southern Florida and several buildings were evacuated, particularly in Miami-Dade County (450 miles away) and the Florida Keys. Several government buildings in Downtown Miami were evacuated, initially on a volunteer basis until a full evacuation was ordered by the local fire department.

See also

List of earthquakes in 2020
List of earthquakes in Cuba
List of earthquakes in the Caribbean

References

Jamaica
2020 in Jamaica
2020 in Cuba
Earthquakes in Jamaica
Earthquakes in Cuba
January 2020 events in North America
Supershear earthquakes
2020 tsunamis